José Luis Márquez Martínez (born 21 June 1966) is a Mexican politician affiliated with the PRI. He currently serves as Deputy of the LXII Legislature of the Mexican Congress representing Puebla.

References

1966 births
Living people
People from Puebla
Institutional Revolutionary Party politicians
21st-century Mexican politicians
Deputies of the LXII Legislature of Mexico
Members of the Chamber of Deputies (Mexico) for Puebla